The State Tribunal of the Republic of Poland is the judicial body, which rules on the constitutional liability of people holding the highest offices of state. It examines cases concerning the infringement of the Constitution and laws or crimes committed by the President, members of the government, the President of the Supreme Chamber of Control, the President of the National Bank of Poland, heads of central administrative offices and other senior state officials.

In Poland, referral to the State Tribunal is used instead of the process of impeachment, which is traditionally used in some other nations as a way of addressing similar allegations against persons holding analogous offices.
 
The State Tribunal is empowered to rule for the removal of individuals from public office, to impose injunctions on individuals against their appointment to senior offices, to revoke an individual's right to vote and to stand for election, to withdraw previously awarded medals, distinctions and titles of honour, and in criminal cases to impose penalties stipulated in the criminal code.

The composition of the State Tribunal is established at the first sitting of each new Sejm and is binding for its term (with the exception that the head of the office is Chief Justice, appointed by President for a six-year term). His two deputies and 16 members of the State Tribunal are chosen from outside the Sejm. Members of the State Tribunal must hold Polish citizenship, may not have a criminal record or have had their civic rights revoked, nor may they be employed in the state administration.

Members

References

External links 
 State Tribunal Webpage

Judiciary of Poland
1921 establishments in Poland
1982 establishments in Poland
Courts and tribunals established in 1921
Courts and tribunals established in 1982